Kishan Singh Rathore (28 April 1583 – May 1615) was the son of Udai Singh of Marwar and the founder of Kishangarh. His sister was the wife of Emperor Jahangir and mother of Shah Jahan.

Family 
Born on 28 April 1583 as Kishan Chand, he was the son of Raja Udai Singh, ruler of Marwar. His mother was Rajavat Kachwahi Manrang Deviji, the principal consort of his father  and the daughter of Raja Askaran of Narwar,  who was also briefly Raja of Amber before being ousted in favour of his uncle, Bharmal. He was also the younger full-brother of Sur Singh, ruler of Marwar and Mani Bai, wife of Jahangir and mother of Shah Jahan.

Under Imperial Service 
Kishan Singh was sent to Mughal service at a very young age. In 1594, he was confirmed by Akbar, the grant of a territory southeast-ward of Jodhpur.

In 1607, he was granted a mansab of 1000 Zat and 500 Sawar by Jahangir.

In  1608, he assisted Mahabat Khan against the Rana of Mewar and had been wounded on the leg by a spear. For his laudable service, Jahangir raised his rank to 2000 Zat and 1000 Sawar. He was also granted the jagir of Setholav.

In 1609, he founded the town of Kishangarh on the site of Setholav.

In 1612, he was granted the title of "Maharaja" by Jahangir.   In March 1615, his mansab was raised to 3000 Zat and 1500 Sawar.

Death 
Kishan Singh died in May 1615 near Ajmer. The incident is described by Jahangir as follows:

He was succeeded by his son Sahas Mal.

Ancestry

References 

Kishangarh
History of Jodhpur
Mughal Empire
People from Jodhpur
1583 births
1615 deaths